Soraga di Fassa (Ladin: Soraga or Soréga) is a comune (municipality) in Trentino in the northern Italian region Trentino-Alto Adige/Südtirol, located about  northeast of Trento.  Soraga borders the following municipalities: Sèn Jan di Fassa, Falcade and Moena.

In the census of 2001, 574 inhabitants out of 673 (85.3%) declared Ladin as their native language.

References

Cities and towns in Trentino-Alto Adige/Südtirol